Theatre Square or Teatralnaya Square (Teatralnaya ploshchad) is a city square in  Saint Petersburg, Russia. It was established in early 1760s and initially was known under the name  Карусельная пл (Merry-go-round Square). It acquired its current name in 1821.

See also
 List of squares in Saint Petersburg

References

Squares in Saint Petersburg
1760s establishments in the Russian Empire